BORGChat is a LAN messaging software program. It has achieved a relative state of popularity and it is considered to be a complete LAN chat program. It has been superseded by commercial products which allow voice chat, video conferencing, central monitoring and administration. An extension called "BORGVoice" adds word producing chat capabilities to BORGChat, the extension remains in alpha stage.

History 
BORGChat was first published from Ionut Cioflan (nickname "IOn") in 2002. The name comes from the BORG race from Star Trek: The Borg is a massive society of cybernetic automatons abducted and assimilated from thousands of species. The Borg collective improves by consuming technologies, in a similar way wishes BORGChat to "assimilate".

Features 
The software supports the following features:
 Public and private chat rooms (channels), support for own chat rooms
 Avatars with user information and online alerts
 Sending private messages
 Sending files and pictures, with pause and bandwidth management
 Animated smileys (emoticons) and sound effects (beep)
 View computers and network shares
 Discussion logs in the LAN
 Message filter, ignore messages from other users
 Message board with Bulletin Board Code (bold, italic, underline)
 Multiple chat status modes: Available/Busy/Away with customizable messages
 Multi language support (with the possibility of adding more languages): English, Romanian, Swedish, Spanish, Polish, Slovak, Italian, Bulgarian, German, Russian, Turkish, Ukrainian, Slovenian, Czech, Danish, French, Latvian, Portuguese, Urdu, Dutch, Hungarian, Serbian, Macedonian.

See also
 Synchronous conferencing
 Comparison of LAN messengers

References

External links 
Official BORGChat website
10 Best Free Chat Rooms

LAN messengers
Online chat